Piñon Unified School District #4 is a school district located on the Navajo Nation Reservation in Piñon, Arizona, United States. The district consists of one elementary, one middle, and one high school: Pinon Elementary School, Pinon Accelerated Middle School, Pinon High School. The school mascot is the Eagle (Atsá).

Students
The majority of students are Navajo (Diné) and live on the Navajo Reservation.

External links
District website

School districts in Navajo County, Arizona
Education on the Navajo Nation